The 1971–72 Danish 1. division season was the 15th season of ice hockey in Denmark. Ten teams participated in the league, and KSF Copenhagen won the championship. Tårnby was relegated.

Regular season

External links
Season on eliteprospects.com

Danish
1971 in Danish sport
1972 in Danish sport